Parliamentary elections were held in the Maldives on 22 March 2014. The Progressive Party of Maldives and its allies won 53 seats.

Background
The elections were held after the controversial presidential elections in which Abdulla Yameen defeated Mohamed Nasheed of the Maldivian Democratic Party. Following the elections the Supreme Court dismissed the Chairman and Deputy Chairman of the Election Commission for contempt of court. The MDP protested, but did not boycott the parliamentary elections.

One the day before the elections Qasim Ibrahim of the Jumhooree Party requested that the Supreme Court to delay the elections due to the Election Commission not having a full complement of members. However, his request was rejected.

Electoral system
The 85 seats in the People's Majlis were elected in single-member constituencies using the first-past-the-post system. The Majlis was expanded from 77 to 85 seats.

Results

References

Elections in the Maldives
Maldives
2014 in the Maldives
March 2014 events in Asia